Incatella is a genus of sea snails, marine gastropod mollusks in the family Turritellidae.

Species
Species within the genus Incatella include:

 Incatella cingulata (G.B. Sowerby I, 1825)
 Incatella cingulatiformis (Möricke, 1896)
 Incatella chilensis (Sowerby, 1846)
 Incatella leptogramma (Philippi, 1887)
 † Incatella hupei Nielsen, 2007
 Incatella trilirata (Philippi, 1887)

References

External links
 [331:ctgfsp 2.0.co;2 Devries T.J. (2007). Cenozoic Turritellidae (Gastropoda) from southern Peru. Journal of Paleontology. 81(2): 331-351.

Turritellidae